Kevin Wood (3 November 1929 – 19 September 2012) was an English professional footballer who played as an inside forward in the Football League for Grimsby Town. He was on the books of Doncaster Rovers, without playing league football for them, and played non-league football for Worksop Town and Peterborough United.

References

1929 births
2012 deaths
People from Armthorpe
Footballers from Doncaster
English footballers
Association football inside forwards
Doncaster Rovers F.C. players
Worksop Town F.C. players
Grimsby Town F.C. players
Peterborough United F.C. players
English Football League players
Midland Football League players